Johnny Albino (December 9, 1919 – May 7, 2011) was a Puerto Rican bolero singer, born in Yauco, Puerto Rico but lived most of his life in Guayama, Puerto Rico.

Biography
Johnny Albino played and sang through his youth years. It was not until years later, however, that he would get a chance to sing as part of an organized act.  Albino joined the United States Army during World War II, where he formed a quartet and was allowed to sing for his fellow soldiers.

In 1946, Albino performed in a trio for the first time.  Later on, he would become a member and lead voice of the Trio San Juan, which went on to become an internationally acclaimed group.

Trio San Juan was rivaled at the time by the Trio Los Panchos for popularity.  Albino later on left Trio San Juan and joined Los Panchos, as the leading voice, replacing another legendary trio singer, Julito Rodríguez.

Albino joined Los Panchos in 1958 and he remained there until 1968.  The group became famous across the world, and Albino toured the United States, Europe and Japan.  With Los Panchos, he recorded Japanese albums, and he also performed alongside well known performers such as Johnny Carson, Frank Sinatra, Sammy Davis Jr. Steve Lawrence and others.

Albino left Los Panchos and went on to form, or become a member of many famous Puerto Rican trios.  Notably, Miguel Poventud whose participation in the album Los Panchos by Special Request are a compilation of love songs recorded in English for CBS. Also, Grandes Exitos de Johnny Albino con Los Panchos DHIT 2093.2 21 June 2005 is his main performance with Miguel Poventud on "requinto" (guitar) and voice accompaniment.

His career spanned over 300 albums and CDs. At 93, he died on May 7, 2011, in Long Island, New York.

See also

List of Puerto Ricans

References 

1919 births
2011 deaths
People from Yauco, Puerto Rico
20th-century Puerto Rican male singers
United States Army soldiers